Deibler is a surname of German origin, originating as an occupational surname for a dove keeper. Notable people with the surname include:

Anatole Deibler (1863-1939), French executioner
Markus Deibler (born 1990), German swimmmer
Steffen Deibler (born 1987), German former competitive swimmer

See also
Diebler